The 1904 Stanford football team represented Stanford University in the 1904 college football season. James F. Lanagan was in his second year as head coach of the team, which played its home games at Stanford Field in Stanford, California.

Stanford allowed only 10 points all season—in two 5–0 losses—and did not allow a point in seven victories and one scoreless tie. The five consecutive wins at the end of the season, combined with eight consecutive wins in the 1905 season, stood as Stanford's longest winning streak for more than 100 years; it was tied by the 1939–1940–1941 teams, and broken by the 2010–2011 teams.

The Big Game against California was the first Big Game to be played at the home field of one of the teams rather than at a neutral site in San Francisco; Stanford defeated California 18–0 at California Field.

Schedule

References

Stanford
Stanford Cardinal football seasons
Stanford football